Yufang mijue, translated into English as Secrets from the Jade Chamber, Secret Formulae from the Jade Alcove, or Secret Instructions from the Jade Chamber, is a Chinese sex manual composed during the Han dynasty.

Publication history
Written during the Han dynasty, the original text is lost, though it was partially preserved in the Japanese medical text Ishinpō. In 1903, Chinese sexologist Ye Dehui published an almost fully reconstructed version of Yufang mijue, alongside four other ancient Chinese texts on sexuality; this was not well-received by the public, and Ye was executed in 1927 for being a "counter-revolutionary".

Contents
Presented as a compilation of quotations from various mythological and obscure figures, Yufang mijue discusses in detail numerous facets of sex, including days on which one is forbidden from having sex and male impotence. The text also echoes many principles taught in an earlier publication on Taoist sexology titled Su Nü Jing, and even includes fictitious dialogue between the Yellow Emperor and his "sexual mentor", the goddess Su Nü; for example, the Yellow Emperor asks her to elaborate on the benefits of "loving with infrequent ejaculation", to which she states:

Literary significance
In Yufang mijue, the Taoist goddess Xiwangmu is described as engaging in "sexual vampirism", and copulating with young boys in order to attain immortalitya claim that is not repeated in any other biography of Xiwangmu. Quoting from Yufang mijue, a chapter of Ishinpō details a method of penis enlargement involving powdered Zanthoxylum piperitum, Orobanche ammophyla, and Asarum, dried inside a dog's bladder for a month.

References

Citations

Bibliography

 
 
 
 
 
 
 
 

Han dynasty literature
Sex manuals
Sexuality in China